Acrosyntaxis is a moth genus in the family Autostichidae.

Species
 Acrosyntaxis accretans Gozmány, 2008
 Acrosyntaxis anagramma Gozmány, 2008
 Acrosyntaxis anasyra Gozmány, 2008
 Acrosyntaxis angustipennis (Rebel, 1927)
 Acrosyntaxis aorista Gozmány, 2008
 Acrosyntaxis astergys Gozmány, 2008
 Acrosyntaxis brandti Gozmány, 2008
 Acrosyntaxis cyclacantha Gozmány, 2008
 Acrosyntaxis eccelestis Gozmány, 2008
 Acrosyntaxis mahunkai Gozmány, 2008
 Acrosyntaxis micracantha Gozmány, 2008
 Acrosyntaxis rhyparastis Gozmány, 2008
 Acrosyntaxis vartiani Gozmány, 2008

References

 
Symmocinae
Moth genera